Pernem is a northmost administrative region or sub-district in North Goa. It acts as the Gateway of Goa from Maharashtra side. It is also the name of the town of Pernem, which is its headquarters. It has a Municipal Council. Geographically, Pernem is surrounded by Sawantwadi sub-district (Maharashtra State) on East, Arabian Sea on West, Bardez and Bicholim sub-district on south and Sawantwadi sub-district (Maharashtra State) on north. The two rivers which decide the boundary of this sub-district are Terekhol River and Chapora River. Terekhol river acts as a border of Maharashtra and Goa while Chapora river acts as a border of Pernem sub-district and Bardez sub-district.

History
Pernem is counted as belonging to one of the two Goan sub-regions, the Novas Conquistas, or New Conquests. It was taken over, lost and finally regained from the Rajas of Sawantwadi, who were handling the affairs of Pernem Taluka though the Deshprabhu family, (which to this day owns major lands in Pernem taluka) a state on Goa's northern border that allied sometimes with the Portuguese and sometimes with the Marathas. (The Kingdom of Sawantwadi was integrated into the district of Ratnagiri after 1947 and is now part of the district of Sindhudurg). After the capture of Goa by Indian Armed Forces from Portuguese, it became part of Union Territory of Goa.

Pernem is the Portuguese spelling (the m only makes the e nasal). The name in Konkani Pedne, and inhabitants are called Pednecar in Konkani. The surname Pednekar used by some Konkanastha Brahmans may indicate their origins in Pernem.

Location
The Konkan Railway passes through Pernem, and there is a railway station called Pernem  at a distance of about 4 km east from the town. The proposed Mopa International Airport is situated at Mopa in Pernem sub-district. National Highway 17 (NH-17), which connects Mumbai (Bombay) and Goa, passes through Pernem (bypassed at Malpem)

Demographics

As of the 2011 Census of India, Pernem had a population of 70726 with gender ratio of 959 females to 1000 males. However, the child ratio (0–6 years) is much lower i.e. 911. The overall  Males constitute 51% of the population and females 49%. Pernem has an average literacy rate of 82.6%, higher than the national average of 74.04%: male literacy is 84% and female literacy is 75.1%. In Pernem, 9.1% of the population is under 6 years of age. The total  urbanization level is 39.7 percent

Transport
Pernem sub-district is well connected through road and Konkan Railway. Pernem railway station is the first railway station in Goa while coming from Mumbai. Mandovi Express, Konkan Kanya Express, Goa Sampark Kranti Express and Margao–Sawantwadi Road passenger (Train No.50107/50108 halts here. NH-17 passes through this area which connects it to Mumbai and Mangalore.

Culture and religion

Igreja de São José
A Chapel in Pernem was built in 1852 by the Portuguese after their successful Novo Conquistas campaign. It was elevated into a Parish on January 2, 1855. St. Joseph Church, Pernem was rebuilt in 1864. The Parish was renovated in 2002. The Parish has 5 substations constituted of 11 Small Christian Communities. Currently, Fr. Camilo Simoes is appointed as the Parish Priest.

Others
Pedne hosts a very popular annual fair on Kojagiri poornima at Shri Bhagavati Temple premises.
Pernem has contributed immensely to the cultural and literary scene of Goa.

Tourism
This sub-district plays a major part in tourism of North Goa district. Famous places are Kerim or Querim Beach, Arambol Beach, Terekhol Fort, Mandrem beach, Ashwem Beach, Morjim Beach, Alorna Fort (near Alorna panchakroshi).

Also near Mlpem on NH-17 there is the Shri Mulveer Temple.

Casa de Hospides 
Also called the House of Hospitality (in English), this building was built by the Portuguese for the Visconde de Pernem (Viscount of Pernem). It was basically a Guest house for Europeans visiting the northern frontier of Goa. After the capture of Goa by India, the former caretakers of the house - the Deshprabhus, took ownership of the building and reside in it to this date.

Settlements

Cities
Cities in the district include: Pernem City. Though it may not be large enough to be considered a city, it serves as the Sub-district's capital.

Towns
Towns in the district include: Mandrem, Morjim, Arambol, Parcem

Villages
Villages in the district include: Agarvado, Alorna, Amberem, Cansarvornem, Casnem, Chandel, Chopdem, Corgão, Dargalim, Ibrampur, Mopa, Ozorim, Paliem, Pernem, Poroscodem, Querim, Tamboxem, Tiracol, Torxem, Tuem, Uguem, Varconda, Virnora.

References

External links

Taluks of Goa
Geography of North Goa district
hi:परनेम
bpy:পেরেনেম